The R171 road is a regional road in Ireland linking Ardee and Dundalk in County Louth. Clochafarmore is located along the R171.

See also 

 Roads in Ireland
 National primary road
 National secondary road

References 

Regional roads in the Republic of Ireland
Roads in County Louth